Tobique is an unincorporated community in Rogers Township, Cass County, Minnesota, United States, near Remer. It is situated along Tobique Road NE near Cass County Road 4.

References

Unincorporated communities in Cass County, Minnesota
Unincorporated communities in Minnesota